Rosángela Balbó (April 16, 1941 – November 3, 2011, born Rosa Angela Giovanna Balbó Rosso) was a Mexican-Italian born     actress. She was better knownfor the Mexican films Entre Pobretones y Ricachones, Como Gallos de Pelea, Los que verán a Dios and Los hipócritas.

Biography 
Balbó was born April 16, 1941 Turin, Piedmont, Italy, the daughter of Félix Balbó and María Ana Rosso. She had a brother who died in an accident. As a consequence of the Second world war, in 1946, when she was 5 years old, with her family left Italy and settled in Argentina. As a child she dressed with her little friends and staged plays. She won a beauty contest that was performed on television as the "Reina de Villa del Parque". In this country she studied acting and made her debut in the Argentine film Amorina in 1961. This was followed by titles such as Buscando a Mónica, Los que verán a Dios and Los hipócritas. In 1967, she left Argentina and traveled to Mexico, where she finally settled, making her debut in the country in the film La perra, where she shared the scene with Julio Alemán and Carlos López Moctezuma.

She had many interests in telenovelas Pobre Clara, Juegos del destino, Alcanzar una estrella II, Acapulco, cuerpo y alma, Ángela, Tres mujeres, Siempre te amaré, Heridas de amor, and Las tontas no van al cielo. The last telenovelas in which she participated were Rafaela and La fuerza del destino.

Death
In 2010 Balbó was diagnosed with lung cancer, because of this she left her smoking habit which consisted of two daily packs of cigarettes. Balbó recovered and continued working, although in 2011 the cancer resurfaced aggressively and lodged in her left lung. Although Balbó fought against her illness, she finally lost the battle, on November 3, 2011.

At the time of her death, Balbó served as president of the children nursery and kindergarten of ANDA, through the patronage of "Rosa Mexicano", where Rosángela had like friends to the actresses Yolanda Mérida and Marta Zamora.

She was veiled at a funeral parlor in Colonia San Rafael, and her remains were cremated and deposited inside an urn in a crypt near the ANDA building.

Filmography

Theatre
Los árboles mueren de pie
Monólogos de la vagina
Mujeres juntas... ni difuntas

References

External links 
 

1941 births
2011 deaths
Mexican telenovela actresses
Mexican television actresses
Mexican film actresses
Mexican stage actresses
20th-century Mexican actresses
21st-century Mexican actresses
Italian emigrants to Mexico
Naturalized citizens of Mexico
Italian emigrants to Argentina
Deaths from lung cancer in Mexico